Illinoi is an unincorporated community on the Illinois/Indiana state line, United States. Illinoi was originally a station on the Indiana, Illinois and Iowa Railroad, later part of the Chicago, Indiana and Southern Railroad, then the New York Central Railroad, then Penn Central Transportation and finally Conrail (by which time there was no passenger service). The line is now owned and operated by the Norfolk Southern Railway through its subsidiary New York Central Lines.

References

Unincorporated communities in Kankakee County, Illinois
Unincorporated communities in Illinois
Unincorporated communities in Lake County, Indiana
Unincorporated communities in Indiana